The following is a list of football stadiums in Jordan, ordered by capacity.

Current stadiums

See also
 List of Asian stadiums by capacity
 List of association football stadiums by capacity

References

External links
 Goalzz.com
 StadiumDB.com

 
Jordan
Football stadiums
Football stadiums